Sabine Klaschka (born 8 August 1980) is a retired German tennis player.

At the 2005 Wimbledon Championships she beat British number one Elena Baltacha, before she was defeated in the second round by sixth seed Elena Dementieva.

On 12 September 2005, she reached her all time ranking high of world No. 133.

Sabine's younger sister, Carmen, also had been a professional tennis player.

ITF finals

Singles (2–5)

Doubles (1–3)

References

External links
 
 

1980 births
Living people
Tennis players from Munich
German female tennis players
21st-century German women